Emilie Enger Mehl  (born 8 August 1993) is a Norwegian politician for the Centre Party. She has served as minister of justice since 2021 and Member of parliament for Hedmark since 2017.

Personal life and education
Mehl was born in Lørenskog on 8 August 1993, a daughter of Eivind Mehl and Ellen Enger Müller. She holds a Master of laws (LL.M.) from the University of Oslo Faculty of Law.

Career

Parliament
Mehl was elected representative to the Storting for the period 2017–2021 for the Centre Party. She was member of the Standing Committee on Justice from 2017 to 2020, and the Parliamentary Assembly of the Council of Europe (PACE) from 2017 to 2021. From 2020 to 2021 she was member of the Standing Committee on Foreign Affairs and Defence and of the Enlarged Committee on Foreign Affairs and Defence. She was re-elected to the Storting for the period 2021–2025, and was replaced by deputy Margrethe Haarr while being part of the Støre's Cabinet from October 2021.

Local politics
She was elected representative to the county council of Hedmark from 2015.

Minister of Justice

2021
She was appointed minister of justice on 14 October 2021. At the time of her appointment, she became the country's youngest person to serve as minister of justice.

Mehl laid down flowers, for the victims of the Kongsberg attack. The attack happened the day before she was appointed, and she was accompanied by the prime minister.

In October 2021, she spoke about the issue of  alleged abuse of power by police, during handling of drug cases.

In early November, she focused on the recent shootings in the capital: eight young men had been shot (by other civilians) over the span of ten weeks.

She rejected the Norwegian Correctional Service's proposal of reducing the amount of prisons from 32 to 13.

2022

In May 2022, she appeared in front of the Standing Committee on Justice to answer about the controversy regarding Hans Sverre Sjøvold, chief of Police Security Service. He resigned the following month.

There was a shortage of blank passports in May [and for some time later], and that became a bottleneck for the authorities' issuing of passports. (Mehl had already warned in March 2022, of an upcoming period where many applicants for new passports—would have to wait for unreasonably long periods of time; Thales Group were responsible for the production of the passports). 

The government made a proposal to change the court system.
 Possible changes to the court system were being evaluated (as of May 2022).
 Regarding the proposed changes, she said that she wished to listen to [opinions or] voices from the districts, rather than the strong opposition from legal experts - because the experts are mostly based in the capital city.

In August 2022, Mehl recognized that Russian vessels posed a potential risk to Norwegian interests.

Later in August, it was revealed that Mehl had declined the treatment of wounded Ukrainian soldiers in Norway despite the Ministry of Foreign Affairs having approved the request. Only weeks later did she give the same response as said ministry did. At the same time, Mehl didn't disclose these details when questioned about it in the Storting. The Standing Committee on Scrutiny and Constitutional Affairs notified that they would be setting up a hearing for the case, and would be calling Mehl, prime minister Støre and foreign minister Anniken Huitfeldt in for questioning.

On 17 October, she warned people to be on high alert and report suspicious drone activity.

Later in October, Mehl ordered a full fact-finding on all institutions that have handled the investigations and judicial proceedings of the Baneheia murders. She added that the ministry of justice is now creating a mandate for the fact-finding.

In October, Mehl also presented Beate Gangås as the new chief of the Norwegian Police Security Service.

From 31 October, she had six days to answer to parliament; some MPs have said that a recent purchase of Chinese drones from DJI, should have been stopped. Previously, in January 2022, the Conservative Party expressed concerns for national security regarding the police's process for acquiring Chinese drones from DJI. In response, Mehl called for a meeting with director of police Benedicte Bjørnland later that month.

On 2 November 2022, Mehl was forced to withdraw an inquiry that the ministry of justice had ordered from the Police Directorate; the withdrawal happened 3 hours after media told about the inquiry. The Office of the Prime Minister
contacted the leadership of the Centre Party, to express concern. The inquiry had desired to decentralize the national police force; furthermore, one goal was to create 20 new police stations - each with 5 police officers - in the districts; the inquiry was supposed to "map out the possibility for making large cuts, regarding police in the big cities". On 9 November, media said that 3 of the 4 points of the inquiry, have not yet been stopped (by Mehl).

On 4 November, Per-Willy Amundsen, leader of the Standing Committee on Justice said that it is incomprehensible that Mehl is not intervening and giving orders to the justice ministry and underlying agencies, regarding answers to questions about the case involving employment termination of a whistleblower at the Norwegian Police Security Service (PST). After having whistleblowed - in regard to Benedicte Bjørnland, Roger Berg and Kaare Songstad - the whistleblower was told that he would need two authorities to give him authorization - for access to classified information: a (relevant) police chief and also the chief of PST. In a 2 November reply to Ingvild Wetrhus Thorsvik of the Standing Committee on Justice, Mehl claimed that such "double authorization" is required by law; however, on 4 November media revealed that 3 documents from the justice ministry from 2017, 2019 and 2020 say otherwise. Carl I. Hagen, a member of the Standing Committee on Scrutiny and Constitutional Affairs sent questions to Mehl, asking her how many PST servicemen already have been subjected to "double authorization". As of 5 November, Thorsvik has sent additional questions to Mehl.

In December 2022, the opposition parties, together with the government parties, demanded that a position be created for an ombud for whistleblowing regarding police matters or perhaps even regarding matters of the justice sector. Mehl had already said in May that she would create that position, but she later shelved the idea. In May 2022, the police union in Norway had rejected the one proposed version of the idea.

On 15 December, Mehl issued an apology on behalf of the government in relation to the wrongful conviction of Viggo Kristiansen in the Baneheia murders.

Other
Mehl is previously known as the winner of the first season (2015) of the Norwegian reality show .

She also participated in the third season of Kompani Lauritzen, but did not accept payment for her participation, but instead wished for her remuneration to be donated to charity organisations. She went on to win the season.

References

1993 births
Living people
Centre Party (Norway) politicians
Female justice ministers
Hedmark politicians
Members of the Storting
Ministers of Justice of Norway
People from Åsnes
Reality show winners